Ban Vianglouang  is a village in Phouvong District in the Attapeu Province of southeastern Laos.

References

Populated places in Attapeu province
Phouvong District